Coercive isomorphic change involves pressures on an organization from other organizations in which they are dependent upon and by cultural expectations from society. 

Some are governmental mandates, some are derived from contract law or financial reporting requirements. "Organizations are increasingly homogeneous within given domains and increasingly organized around rituals of conformity to wider institutions". Political organizations normalize this concept definitively.

Coercive isomorphism is in contrast to mimetic isomorphism, where uncertainty encourages imitation, and similar to normative isomorphism, where professional standards or networks influence change.

Large corporations can have similar impact on their subsidiaries.

References 

Organizational theory